The 2009–10 Basketball League of Serbia season was the 4th season of the Basketball League of Serbia, the highest professional basketball league in Serbia. It was also 66th national championship played by Serbian clubs inclusive of nation's previous incarnations as Yugoslavia and Serbia & Montenegro.

Regular season

First League standings

Super League standings

Playoff stage

External links

 Semifinals - Ref: Politika 
 Final - 1st Game - Ref: Politika 
 Final - 2nd Game - Ref: Politika 
 Prelude to 3rd Game - Ref: Politika 
 Final - 3rd Game - Ref: Politika 

(1) Hemofarm forfeited third match. It was registered with official result 20:0 for Partizan because after more than 15 minutes of waiting Hemofarm did not show up to play a match.

Basketball League of Serbia seasons
Serbia
1